Peterlee Community Hospital is a health facility in O'Neill Drive, Peterlee, County Durham, England. It is managed by North Tees and Hartlepool NHS Foundation Trust.

History
The facility was commissioned after pressure from local members of parliament to provide modern healthcare in this growing industrial area. After appropriate ground condition surveys, construction started and it opened as Peterlee Community Hospital in the late 1990s. The urgent care centre closed for overnight treatment in late 2019.

References

Hospitals in County Durham
NHS hospitals in England